Reales de La Vega is a professional basketball team based in La Vega Province, Dominican Republic. The team currently plays in the Dominican top division, Liga Nacional de Baloncesto.

Championships
Liga Nacional de Baloncesto  (2x) 
2005, 2018

Notable players
To appear in this section a player must have either:
- Set a club record or won an individual award as a professional player.
- Played at least one official international match for his senior national team at any time.

 Rigoberto Mendoza

References

Basketball teams established in 2005
Basketball teams in the Dominican Republic